The 1954 Campeonato Profesional was the seventh season of Colombia's top-flight football league. 10 teams compete against one another and played each weekend. The tournament was notable for being the sixth and last year of El Dorado. Atlético Nacional won the league for 1st time in its history after getting 31 points. Millonarios, the defending champion, was 5th with 18 points.

Background
The tournament was the sixth and last year of El Dorado. The Pacto de Lima with the FIFA forced the foreign players to return to their countries in October. It was a very irregular tournament in which four matches were not played and seven were suspended by walkover.

10 teams competed in the tournament, two less than the previous year: Atlético Bucaramanga, Cúcuta Deportivo, Deportivo Pereira and Junior withdrew due to financial problems, Sporting de Barranquilla was dissolved, while América de Cali and Independiente Medellín return to the tournament. Atlético Manizales come in as the only new team. Atlético Nacional won the championship for first time, losing only against Boca Juniors de Cali through the tournament.

League system
Every team played two games against each other team, one at home and one away. Teams received two points for a win and one point for a draw. If two or more teams were tied on points, places were determined by goal difference. The team with the most points is the champion of the league.

Teams

a América played its home games at Palmira

Final standings

Results

Top goalscorers

Source: RSSSF.com Colombia 1954

References

External links
Dimayor Official Page

Prim
Colombia
Categoría Primera A seasons